Peddlin' Dreams is the sixth album by American singer-songwriter Maria McKee, released in 2005 (see 2005 in music).

Track listing
All tracks composed by Maria McKee, except where indicated.
"Season of the Fair" – 3:34
"Sullen Soul" (Jim Akin) – 4:26
"Turn Away" (McKee, Bruce Brody) – 3:23
"Peddlin' Dreams" – 4:31
"My One True Love" (Jim Akin) – 3:37
"People in the Way" – 4:14
"The Horse Life" – 3:07
"Drowned and Died" (McKee, Jim Akin) – 4:14
"Appalachian Boy" – 5:04
"Everyone's Got a Story" – 3:04
"Barstool Blues" (Neil Young) – 3:05
"(You Don't Know) How Glad I Am" (Jimmy Williams, Larry Harrison) – 2:56

Personnel
Maria McKee – acoustic and electric guitar, piano, vocals
Jim Akin – electric guitar, bass, double bass, keyboards, steel guitar, backing vocals
Jerry Andrews – acoustic and electric guitar, backing vocals
Tom Dunne – percussion

References

Maria McKee albums
2005 albums